Albert J. Trace (aka Albert Joseph Trace; né Feinberg;  25 December 1900 – 31 August 1993) was an American songwriter and orchestra leader of the 1930s, 1940s and 1950s. His popularity peaked in the Chicago area during the height of the Big Band era. He was the brother of the songwriter Ben Trace.

Career 
A native of Chicago, Trace played professional baseball before deciding on music as a career. His first jobs during the early 1920s included playing the drums and singing with various bands, until he formed his own band in 1933, the year in which Chicago was celebrating its centennial with a World's Fair officially known as A Century of Progress International Exposition. The band's first engagement in May 1933 was at the Fair's French pavilion and, when the Fair closed for the winter in November, he remained in Chicago, beginning a long engagement at the Blackhawk Restaurant, followed by three years at the Sherman Hotel. Starting in early 1943 and continuing during and after World War II, the Al Trace Orchestra, including the vocalists Toni Arden and Bob Vincent, were familiar regulars on the Chicago-based It Pays to Be Ignorant, one of the most popular shows of the era known as the Golden Age of Radio.

Al Trace and His Silly Symphonists was one of several comedy ensembles in the early 1940s. Others included Spike Jones and His City Slickers, the Hoosier Hot Shots and the Korn Kobblers. In February 1945, radio stations introduced "Sioux City Sue", performed by Al Trace and His Silly Symphonists (National Records 5007). The song became a hit.

Trace recorded for several record companies: Mercury Records, National Records, MGM Records, Columbia Records, Damon Records, Regent Records and Chance Records. He composed over 300 songs, some alone and others as a collaborator, most frequently with his brother, Ben Trace, while also writing a considerable number of songs using the pseudonyms Clem Watts or Bob Hart.  Among the Ben Trace/Al Trace collaborations was his most successful recording, "You Call Everybody Darlin'", which was a #1 hit in 1948. Another very popular song was "If I Knew You Were Comin' I'd've Baked a Cake". His other song collaborators included Al Hoffman, Bob Merrill and Abner Silver.

In 1975, shortly after his 74th birthday, he retired from active work as a songwriter and bandleader and joined with another ex-bandleader to form a booking agency in Scottsdale, Arizona.

Trace died of a stroke in Sun City West, Arizona, at the age of 92.

Ensembles led by Trace 
 1944–1948: Al Trace and His Silly Symphonists
 1948–1950: Al Trace And His New Orchestra
 1949: Al Trace & His Flame Throwers
 1953: Al Trace and His Orchestra

References

External links

American bandleaders
Songwriters from Illinois
Musicians from Chicago
1900 births
1993 deaths
20th-century American male musicians